Extreme may refer to:

Science and mathematics

Mathematics
Extreme point, a point in a convex set which does not lie in any open line segment joining two points in the set
Maxima and minima, extremes on a mathematical function

Science
Extremophile, an organism which thrives in or requires "extreme" 
Extremes on Earth
List of extrasolar planet extremes

Politics
Extremism, political ideologies or actions deemed outside the acceptable range
The Extreme (Italy) or Historical Far Left, a left-wing parliamentary group in Italy 1867–1904

Business
Extreme Networks, a California-based networking hardware company
Extreme Records, an Australia-based record label
Extreme Associates, a California-based adult film studio

Computer science 
Xtreme Mod, a peer-to-peer file sharing client for Windows

Sports and entertainment

Sport
Extreme sport
Extreme Sports Channel A global sports and lifestyle brand dedicated to extreme sports and youth culture
Los Angeles Xtreme, a defunct XFL franchise

Music
Extreme metal, an umbrella term for a group of related heavy metal subgenres
Extreme (band), an American band
Extreme (album), an album by Extreme
Xtreme (group), a bachata duo
Xtreme (album), an album by Xtreme
Extremes (album), an album by Collin Raye
X-Treme, a stage name of Italian singer and producer Agostino Carollo

Entertainment
Extreme Sports Channel, a global TV channel dedicated to extreme sports and youth culture
RTL CBS Extreme, a Southeast Asian TV channel simply known as "Extreme" prior to the rebranding as Blue Ant Extreme
Extreme (1995 TV series), a 1995 American action series that aired on ABC
Extreme (2009 TV series), a 2009 American television series that aired on the Travel Channel
"Extreme" (CSI: Miami), a season two episode of CSI: Miami

Literature
The Extreme (novel), a 1998 Animorphs novel by K. A. Applegate
Extremes (novel),  by Kristine Kathryn Rusch
Extreme Studios, a forerunner of the American comic book studio Image Comics
Adam X the X-Treme, a character in the Marvel Comics universe
Extreme, an autobiography by Sharon Osbourne

Other uses
Chevrolet Extreme, a name for the Chevrolet S-10 pickup truck
Extrême, a pre-filled ice-cream cone brand by Nestlé

See also 

Extremities (disambiguation)
Lunatic fringe (disambiguation)